Chaharduli District is a district (bakhsh) in Qorveh County, Kurdistan Province, Iran. At the 2006 census, its population was 18,649, in 4,372 families.  The District has one city: Dezej.  The District has two rural districts (dehestan): Chaharduli-ye Gharbi Rural District and Chaharduli-ye Sharqi Rural District.

References 

Qorveh County
Districts of Kurdistan Province